Srđan Ajković (born 15 October 1991) is a Montenegrin professional footballer who plays as a left winger. He most recently played for FK Zvijezda 09 in the Premier League of Bosnia and Herzegovina.

Honours

Player

Club
Grbalj
Montenegrin Cup runner up: 2016–17

References

External links
Srđan Ajković at Sofascore

1991 births
Living people
Footballers from Podgorica
Association football wingers
Montenegrin footballers
Montenegro youth international footballers
FK Zeta players
FK Rad players
FK Lovćen players
FK BSK Borča players
FK Jedinstvo Užice players
FK Zemun players
OFK Grbalj players 
FK Zvijezda 09 players
Montenegrin First League players 
Serbian SuperLiga players
Serbian First League players
Premier League of Bosnia and Herzegovina players
Montenegrin expatriate footballers
Expatriate footballers in Serbia
Montenegrin expatriate sportspeople in Serbia
Expatriate footballers in Bosnia and Herzegovina
Montenegrin expatriate sportspeople in Bosnia and Herzegovina